The Chollima is a monthly educational magazine of the Democratic People's Republic of Korea. It was first published in January 1959, initially to support the Chollima Movement. The publisher is the Chollima Editing Committee of the  Art and Literature Publishing House(문학예술종합출판사). Unlike most other magazines in the country, it is targeted at the general public.

References

1959 establishments in North Korea
Communist magazines
Education magazines
Magazines published in North Korea
Magazines established in 1959
Mass media in Pyongyang
Monthly magazines
Propaganda newspapers and magazines
State media